Wakaleo schouteni is a species of carnivorous marsupial that was discovered at fossil sites in South Australia.

Taxonomy
The description of the species was published in 2017, the collaborating authors Anna Gillespie, Mike Archer and Suzanne Hand working on the PANGEA research project based at the University of New South Wales.
The holotype is a largely complete skull retaining some teeth and alveoli, with other materials such as the lower jaw and a humerus associated with the new species as paratypes.
The discovery of more complete evidence of Oligocene species of the marsupial lion lineages prompted the authors to emend the circumscription of Wakaleo to include the type species of another genus, Priscileo pitikantensis, as a sister species to this taxon and contradicting a 2016 study that supported separation of P. pitikantensis from the wakaleo clade.
Another early thylacoleonid species, "Priscileo" roskellyae, was determined to have diverged from this genus during early period of the fossil record, and scant evidence of the species did not allow revising authors to assign a taxonomic placement with any confidence.

A painter celebrated for his reconstructions of ancient animals, Peter Schouten, was honored by the authors in their proposed epithet for the species.
The species was itself depicted by Schouten, in a conception of the animal contesting a thylacine for its kill, a kangaroo, in the early Miocene rainforest of Riversleigh.

Description
A species assigned to Wakaleo and resembling a contemporary animal of the Oligocene, Wakaleo pitikantensis. They were mid-sized predators who probably hunted in trees or ambushed prey from a branch.
Calculations of the size following a method of statistical analysis for predicting body size, derived from 164 millimetres for the greatest length of the skull, indicate a weight of 22.6 or 24.0 kilograms. Another estimate using regression equations previously used in calculations of body size for Thylacoleo carnifex, a very large carnivore, resulted in a value around 5 kg that the describing authors considered too small.
The dentition suggests that W. schouteni may have been omnivorous, but reveals the transition to hyper-carnivory of the genus during the Miocene.

The distribution of the species included the Riversleigh World Heritage Area in the northwest of Queensland, at sediments dated to the later Oligocene to early Miocene.
The assumption of at least partially arboreal habits is by the forest types that existed during the Oligo-Miocene at Riversleigh, open woodlands with the later development of rainforest. The humerus morphology is proposed to support this conception as a scansorial and arboreal predator, being similar to the structures of the arm and shoulder in species such as Phascolarctos cinereus, the related koala, and spotted cuscus Spilocuscus maculatus.

References

Fossil taxa described in 2017
Carnivorous marsupials
Prehistoric mammals of Australia
Wakaleo
Pleistocene mammals
Riversleigh fauna